Riverman (1969–1999) was a French Thoroughbred racehorse.

Background
Foaled in Kentucky, Riverman was bred by Harry F. Guggenheim of the prominent American Guggenheim family. Riverman was from the mare River Lady and sired by Guggenheim's stallion Never Bend, a grandson of the extremely important sire, Nearco.

Purchased by French perfume magnate Pierre Wertheimer, head of the House of Chanel, the colt raced under the colors of his wife, Germaine.

Racing career
Trained by Alec Head, Riverman was sent to the track in 1971 where he won the Prix Yacowlef and finished second in the Critérium de Maisons-Laffitte. The following year, he won the Group II Prix Jean Prat plus two Group One races, the Prix d'Ispahan and the Poule d'Essai des Poulains. Sent to race in England, he notably ran third to Brigadier Gerard in July's King George VI and Queen Elizabeth Stakes and second to him in October's Champion Stakes.

Stud record
Retired to stud duty in 1974, Riverman stood at Haras du Quesnay in Calvados until 1980 when he was sent to Gainesway Farm in Kentucky. The leading sire in France in 1980 and 1981, Riverman sired Group One winners All At Sea, Loup Sauvage, Latin American, Pilaster, River Flyer, River Special, Rousillon plus other important Group One winners and Champions such as:
 Bahri - Queen Elizabeth II Stakes, St. James's Palace Stakes
 Detroit - filly who won the 1980 Prix de l'Arc de Triomphe, 1980 French Horse of the Year, Champion 3-year-old filly in France
 Gold River - filly who won the 1981 Prix de l'Arc de Triomphe, Champion 3-year-old filly in France
 Hailsham - won the 1991 Derby Italiano
 Irish River - French Horse Racing Hall of Fame, won ten of twelve starts, Champion 2-Year-Old in France, Champion Miler in France
 River Memories - won the Prix de Pomone, Prix Maurice de Nieuil, Canadian International Stakes, Flower Bowl Invitational Stakes
 Rami Winner of the Concorde Stks and second in the Queen Anne Royal Ascot, a leading sire in South Africa
 Rivlia - Graded stakes winner in France and multiple Grade I winner in California
 Triptych - multiple stakes winner including the Irish 2,000 Guineas and back-to-back Coronation Cups in 1987 and 1988.

Riverman was the damsire of Spinning World, the  Champion Three-Year-Old in Ireland (1996) and Champion Older Horse in France (1997) and of Six Perfections, the 2002 European Champion Two-Year-Old Filly. As well, Riverman sired the mare Tugela who produced the great Australian Racing Hall of Fame superstar Makybe Diva, the only horse to ever win three consecutive Melbourne Cups and who is Australasia's all-time leading money earner.

Through his sons, Riverman is the grandsire of the great filly Hatoof who was a Champion in France in 1991 and 1993 and was voted the 1994 United States Eclipse Award for Outstanding Female Turf Horse. Riverman was also the grandsire of Vintage Crop, the 1993 European Top Stayer, Paradise Creek, a multiple Grade I winner in the U.S. and winner of the 1994 Eclipse Award for Outstanding Male Turf Horse, and of Sakhee, winner of the 2001 Prix de l'Arc de Triomphe.

Riverman died at age thirty in July 1999 at Gainesway Farm.

Pedigree

References
 Riverman's pedigree and racing stats

1969 racehorse births
1999 racehorse deaths
Racehorses bred in Kentucky
Racehorses trained in France
Champion Thoroughbred Sires of France
Thoroughbred family 10-a
Chefs-de-Race